Melese incertus is a moth of the family Erebidae. It was described by Francis Walker in 1855. It is found in French Guiana, Suriname, Guyana, Brazil, Venezuela, Trinidad, Peru, Bolivia and Panama.

References

 

Melese
Moths described in 1855
Arctiinae of South America